These are the Billboard R&B albums that reached number one in 1975.

Chart history

See also
1975 in music
R&B number-one hits of 1975 (USA)

1975
1975 record charts